Ivo Trenchev (born 4 April 1972) is a former Bulgarian footballer who played as a defender.

Honours
Levski Sofia
 Champion of Bulgaria 2002

Henan Jianye
China League One: 2006

References

External links
Footmercato profile
Profile at LevskiSofia.info

1972 births
Living people
Bulgarian footballers
Bulgarian expatriate footballers
First Professional Football League (Bulgaria) players
Chinese Super League players
China League One players
PFC CSKA Sofia players
PFC Slavia Sofia players
FC Lokomotiv 1929 Sofia players
PFC Levski Sofia players
PFC Spartak Varna players
FC Akhmat Grozny players
PFC Lokomotiv Mezdra players
Henan Songshan Longmen F.C. players
Expatriate footballers in Russia
Expatriate footballers in China
Bulgarian expatriate sportspeople in China
Bulgarian football managers
PFC Pirin Blagoevgrad managers
Association football defenders
People from Sandanski
Sportspeople from Blagoevgrad Province